"Compliments" is the first single from Band of Horses' third album Infinite Arms, which was released on April 1, 2010.  It failed to chart, but was a radio hit, particularly in Seattle, WA where the band formed.

Reception
The Seattle Times said that "Compliments" "has a faint whisper of country-disco" in a generally negative review of Infinite Arms. However, The Daily World said that "Compliments" was one of the stand-out tracks on Infinite Arms.

Personnel
Benjamin Bridwell - vocals, guitars, drums, sounds, memotron
Creighton Barret - drums, thunderdrum, percussion
Ryan Monroe - keyboards, vocals, percussion, guitar
Bill Reynolds - bass, tambourine, guitar, percussion, sounds
Tyler Ramsey - guitar, vocals, percussion, keyboards, piano, theremin

References

External links
Music Video for Compliments on Youtube

2010 songs
2010 singles
Band of Horses songs
Songs written by Ben Bridwell